David Lindsay "Dave" Turner (September 23, 1923 – June 26, 2015) was an American competition rower and Olympic champion, naval aviator in World War II, Korean War and Vietnam War and later hurricane hunter for the US Navy and NOAA. Born in Oakland, California, he won a gold medal in coxed eights at the 1948 Summer Olympics, as a member of the American team. His brother Ian was on the same Olympic team.

References 

1923 births
2015 deaths
American male rowers
Rowers at the 1948 Summer Olympics
Olympic gold medalists for the United States in rowing
Sportspeople from Oakland, California
Medalists at the 1948 Summer Olympics
United States Navy personnel of World War II
United States Navy personnel of the Korean War
United States Navy personnel of the Vietnam War